Hygrocybe coccinea, sometimes called the scarlet hood, scarlet waxcap or righteous red waxy cap, is a colourful member of the mushroom genus Hygrocybe. These waxcaps are found across the Northern Hemisphere from China and Japan to Europe and North America. The small bright red mushroom is a familiar sight in unimproved grasslands in Europe in late summer and autumn, and woodlands in North America in winter.

Taxonomy
The scarlet hood was first described as Agaricus coccineus by German mycologist Jacob Christian Schäffer in 1774, before being transferred to the genus Hygrophorus by Elias Magnus Fries in 1838, and finally Hygrocybe by Paul Kummer in 1871. The specific epithet coccinea is Latin for "scarlet".

Description
A small waxcap with an initially bell-shaped, and later flattening, cap 2–5 cm (¾–2 in) across, scarlet in colour and slimy in texture. The adnate gills are thick and widely spaced, yellow red in colour. The spore print is white. The ringless stipe is 2–5 cm (¾–2 in) high and 0.3–1 cm (⅛–⅓ in) wide, red with a yellowish base. The flesh is yellowish-red and the smell and taste faint. The oval spores measure 7–9.5 x 4–5 μm.

Distribution and habitat
Hygrocybe coccinea has a wide distribution in unimproved grasslands across Europe from August to October. In Britain, like all Hygrocybes, it has its best seasons in frost-free late autumn months, and in western North America it may be found under redwoods or in mixed woodland in winter. It has been recorded growing under Rhododendron and oak (Quercus) in Sagarmatha National Park in Nepal, and also occurs in India, China and Japan.

Specimens initially identified as H. coccinea in Australia have been reclassified as H. miniata or H. kandora.

Edibility
The scarlet hood is edible, but of fairly little interest. It should not be confused with the inedible H. punicea.

See also
List of Hygrocybe species

References

coccinea
Edible fungi
Fungi of Europe
Fungi of North America
Fungi described in 1774
Taxa named by Jacob Christian Schäffer